The 2024 United States House of Representatives elections in Virginia will be held on November 5, 2024, to elect the eleven U.S. representatives from the State of Virginia, one from all eleven of the state's congressional districts. The elections will coincide with the 2024 U.S. presidential election, as well as other elections to the House of Representatives, elections to the United States Senate, and various state and local elections.

District 1

The 1st district is based in the western Chesapeake Bay and includes portions of suburban Richmond. Within the district are western Henrico and Chesterfield counties. Other localities in the district include Colonial Beach, Mechanicsville, and Williamsburg. The incumbent is Republican Rob Wittman, who was reelected with 56.8% of the vote in 2022.

Republican primary

Candidates

Potential
Rob Wittman, incumbent U.S. Representative

Democratic primary

Candidates

Publicly expressed interest
Herb Jones, former New Kent County Treasurer and nominee in 2022

General election

Predictions

District 2

The 2nd district is based in Hampton Roads, containing the cities of Chesapeake, Franklin, Suffolk, and Virginia Beach. Virginia's Eastern Shore is also located within the district. The incumbent is Republican Jen Kiggans, who flipped the district with 51.7% of the vote in 2022.

Republican primary

Candidates

Potential
Jen Kiggans, incumbent U.S. Representative

General election

Predictions

District 7

The 7th district is based in Northern Virginia and encompasses suburban, exurban, and rural areas of Washington. The district contains  Bowling Green, Culpeper, the city of Fredericksburg, Stanardsville, Woodbridge, and a small sliver of Albemarle County. The incumbent is Democrat Abigail Spanberger, who was reelected with 52.3% of the vote in 2022.

Democratic primary

Candidates

Potential
Abigail Spanberger, incumbent U.S. Representative

Republican primary

Candidates

Potential
Derrick Anderson, attorney, former U.S. Army Special Forces Green Beret, and candidate in 2022

General election

Predictions

District 10

The 10th district is based in northern Virginia and the D.C. metro area, encompassing Fauquier, Loudoun, and Rappahannock counties, the independent cities of Manassas and Manassas Park, and portions of Fairfax and Prince William counties. The incumbent is Democrat Jennifer Wexton, who was re-elected with 53.3% of the vote in 2022.

Democratic primary

Candidates

Potential
Jennifer Wexton, incumbent U.S. Representative

Republican primary

Candidates

Publicly expressed interest
 Hung Cao, nonprofit founder, U.S. Navy veteran, and nominee in 2022

General election

Predictions

References

2024
Virginia
United States House of Representatives